Aliaksandr Lisouski (born November 13, 1985) is a Belarusian racing cyclist. At the 2008 UCI Track Cycling World Championships, he won the gold medal in the scratch race and the bronze in the omnium.

External links

Belarusian male cyclists
1985 births
Living people
Place of birth missing (living people)
UCI Track Cycling World Champions (men)
Belarusian track cyclists